Vysokovo is a rural locality (a village) in Novlyanskoye Rural Settlement, Selivanovsky District, Vladimir Oblast, Russia. The population was 539 as of 2010. There are 5 streets.

Geography 
Vysokovo is located on the Ushna River, 4 km south of Krasnaya Gorbatka (the district's administrative centre) by road. Andreyevka is the nearest rural locality.

References 

Rural localities in Selivanovsky District